Daniel Giubellini (born 19 June 1969) is a Swiss gymnast. He competed in eight events at the 1992 Summer Olympics.

References

1969 births
Living people
Swiss male artistic gymnasts
Olympic gymnasts of Switzerland
Gymnasts at the 1992 Summer Olympics
European champions in gymnastics
Place of birth missing (living people)